Wallasey (previously New Brighton-Wallasey-Warren, 1973 to 1979) is a Wirral Metropolitan Borough Council ward in the Wallasey Parliamentary constituency.

Councillors

References

Wards of Merseyside
Politics of the Metropolitan Borough of Wirral
Wards of the Metropolitan Borough of Wirral